Torralbasia is a monotypic genus of flowering plants belonging to the family Celastraceae. It only contains the one known species, Torralbasia cuneifolia (C.Wright ex A.Gray) Krug & Urb.

It is native to the Caribbean and is found in the countries of Cuba, Dominican Republic and Puerto Rico.

The genus name of Torralbasia is in honour of José Ildefonso Torralbas (1842–1903), Cuban botanist and agronomist; director of the university botanical museum in Havana and professor at the university. The Latin specific epithet of cuneifolia means wedge-shaped, and is derived from cuneate.
Both the genus and the species were first described and published in D.H.Segui, Fl. Med. Tox. Cuba on page 60 in 1900.

There are 3 Accepted subspecies;

References

Celastraceae
Celastrales genera
Plants described in 1900
Flora of Cuba
Flora of the Dominican Republic
Flora of Puerto Rico
Flora without expected TNC conservation status